"Energy (Stay Far Away)" is a song by English grime artist Skepta and Nigerian musician Wizkid. It initially debuted at number 73 on the UK Singles Chart, but reached a peak of number 59 following the release of its music video in September. The song spent a total of 15 weeks on the UK Singles chart. It has been certified Gold by the British Phonographic Industry (BPI).

Critical reception
Pulse Nigeria called it a "groovy song which has a message for anyone with a negative vibe" and a "perfect anthem for clubs". HotNewHipHop called it an "underrated banger" and "just the record to seal Skepta's ambitious switch to the big stage".

Music video
The music video for the song was directed by Meji Alabi and features Skepta and Wizkid partying on a beach in Lagos, Nigeria. It pays homage to Fela Kuti. The Fader magazine said the video was full of "palm trees, white beaches, beautiful people, and good vibes", while Hypebeast considered it to be flaunting Nigeria's "enticing culture".

Charts

Certifications

References

2018 singles
2018 songs
Skepta songs
Wizkid songs
Songs written by Skepta
Songs written by Wizkid